Lars Sidney Raebiger (born 17 April 2005) is a German professional footballer who plays as a midfielder for 2. Bundesliga club Greuther Fürth.

Career
A youth product of Brand-Erbisdorf and Fortuna Langenau, Raebiger joined the youth academy of RB Leipzig in 2015. In 2021, he signed his first professional contract with the club and started training with their senior players. He made his professional debut with RB Leipzig in a 4–0 DFB-Pokal win over Sandhausen on 7 August 2021. At 16 years and 112 days old, he is the youngest ever debutant in RB Leipzig's history.

On 20 June 2022, Raebiger was transferred to recently relegated Greuther Fürth, signing a 3 year contract with the 2. Bundesliga club.

International career
Raebiger is a youth international for Germany, having represented the Germany U16s.

References

External links
 Sidney Raebiger full profile
 
 DFB Profile

2005 births
Living people
Sportspeople from Freiberg
German footballers
Germany youth international footballers
Bundesliga players
RB Leipzig players
SpVgg Greuther Fürth players
Association football midfielders
Footballers from Saxony